Carl Badwa (born February 24, 1968), better known as his stage name B-Kool and today as Don Carlito, is a Canadian rapper.

Early life and career
Badwa began his music career in 1984 when he joined Get Loose Crew.

Awards
In 1990, B-Kool shared in Simply Majestic's Juno Award for Best R&B Soul Recording for "Dance to the Music". In the same year he participated in the recording of "Can't Repress the Cause", a collaborative single released under the name Dance Appeal to advocate for greater inclusion of hip hop in the mainstream of Canadian music. In 1994, he received a Juno nomination for "Gotta Get Over", from his solo album "Mellow Madness".

Comeback
In 2003, he resumed performing, under the name "Don Carlito", with the EP What’s The D.E.A.L. In 2013 he partnered with Frank Morell to release "Fire", and in 2016 they released "Reloaded".

Discography

Studio albums
Get Loose Crew (1988)
Mellow Madness (1994)

Singles
Dance to the Music/Work your body (1990)
Gotta get over(1994)

See also

 Canadian hip hop
 Music of Canada

References

External links
 

Living people
Canadian hip hop record producers
Rappers from Toronto
Black Canadian musicians
1968 births
Canadian male rappers
20th-century Canadian male musicians
20th-century Canadian rappers